Ricardo Fuentes Romero (born January 8, 1980) is a second-generation Mexican professional wrestler, known by his ring name Ricky Marvin, and is most known for his work in the Japanese promotion Pro Wrestling Noah. Between 2005 and 2007, he also wrestled as the masked Mushiking Joker character, a storyline arch-enemy of "Mushiking Terry", who was played by his then-tag team partner Kotaro Suzuki. He also worked as the masked character Bengala in Lucha Libre AAA Worldwide (AAA) and Lucha Underground between 2013 and 2016.

Suzuki and Ricky Marvin were the first Japanese/foreigner team to win the GHC Junior Heavyweight Tag Team Championship, one of three reigns with that championship. Marvin is also a former GHC Junior Heavyweight Champion in Pro Wrestling Noah, a former CMLL Japan Super Lightweight Champion and Mexican National Lightweight Champion in Consejo Mundial de Lucha Libre (CMLL) and one third of the AAA World Trios Champions in AAA. He is the son of retired professional wrestler Ricardo Fuentes and brother of Rolando Romero.

Professional wrestling career
Ricardo Fuentes was trained for his professional wrestling career by his father Ricardo Fuentes, a professional wrestler known by the ring name Aries, and later on by Ringo Mendoza, Negro Casas, and Memo Diaz when he began working for Consejo Mundial de Lucha Libre (CMLL). Fuentes made his debut in 1995, using the ring name White Demon, an enmascarado (masked) character.

Consejo Mundial de Lucha Libre (1998–2003)
In 1998, Fuentes began training in the CMLL wrestling school under Mendoza and Casas, and it was there that he came up with a new ring name, combining his first name, Ricky, and his favorite cartoon character, Marvin the Martian, to create the ring name "Ricky Marvin". As Ricky Marvin, his first appearance at a major CMLL event came at the second Gran Alternativa of 1999, where he teamed with his mentor Ringo Mendoza. In the first round, Marvin and Mendoza defeated Apolo Dantés and Alan Stone but lost to eventual tournament winners El Felino and Tigre Blanco in the second round. On July 16, 1999, Marvin teamed with Sombra de Plata, losing to Fugaz and Sangre Azteca in a match that stole the show, earning the four youngsters a standing ovation from the crowd. The success of that match earned all four a match at CMLL's 66th Anniversary show on September 24, 1999. This time, Marvin and Sombra de Plata won the match. Marvin made his Japanese debut on November 23, 1999, defeating Sangre Azteca, who was also making his debut for CMLL Japan. The rivalry continued on March 17, 2000, as Ricky Marvin defeated Sangre Azteca in a three falls match on the undercard of the 2000 Jucio Final pay-per-view. While working for CMLL Japan, Marvin defeated Virus to win the CMLL Japan Super Lightweight Champion on August 6, 2000. He held the title once more before the organization ceased operations in early 2001. On November 29, 2000, Marvin defeated Virus, this time to win the Mexican National Lightweight Championship. Marvin held the championship until December 3, 2001, when he lost it to Loco Max.

In 2003, the CMLL group Los Guapos created Guapos U, a "reality show"-inspired storyline in which young hopefuls competed to earn a spot in the Los Guapos group. Marvin was one of the wrestlers selected for the first class of Guapos U. During the storyline, fellow "classmate" Zumbido developed a rivalry with Marvin, which got Zumbido kicked out of the group for fighting. Zumbido and Marvin met in a Lucha de Apuesta match in which both wrestlers put their hair on the line. The match ended in a draw, and, as a result, both wrestlers had their hair shaved off after the match. Marvin was the last wrestler eliminated in the Guapos U contest, losing the membership to El Terrible. At the CMLL 70th Anniversary Show, Ricky Marvin teamed with Virus and Volador Jr. to defeat "The Havana Brothers" (Rocco Quance, Puma Boy and Rocky Romero) in a match that several years later is still remembered fondly.

Working in Japan
Marvin returned to Japan on several tours even after CMLL Japan folded, often working for Último Dragón's Toryumon Japan promotion. In Toryumon, Marvin defeated Super Nova on July 7, 2002, to win the NWA World Welterweight Championship. Marvin only held the title for 17 days before losing it to Genki Horiguchi, but the title win helped convince Marvin that his future lay in Japan. From 2003 through 2015 Marvin worked primarily in Japan, only making occasional guest appearances in his native Mexico.

Pro Wrestling Noah (2003–2015)
In 2005 Marvin began working for Pro Wrestling Noah, often appearing at Pro Wrestling SEM events, Noah's league for younger, inexperienced wrestlers. Over time, Marvin began teaming regularly with Kotaro Suzuki. While teaming with Suzuki, Marvin also began a storyline feud with Suzuki's masked alter ego "Mushiking Terry", while he wrestled as the masked Mushiking Joker character himself. The two masked characters wrestled off and on between 2005 and 2007, with both men occasionally wrestling unmasked as well. On January 21, 2007, Marvin and Suzuki defeated Jay Briscoe and Mark Briscoe to win the GHC Junior Heavyweight Tag Team Championship. The team held the title for just over 10 months before losing the championship to the Dragon Gate team "Speed Muscle" (Naruki Doi and Masato Yoshino).

Since Marvin was well versed in Lucha libre, he often teamed with or faced luchadors from Mexico who toured with Noah. In August 2008, Marvin often teamed with Laredo Kid and El Oriental as they wrestled against Histeria, Antifaz, and Rocky Romero, all representing the Mexican Lucha Libre AAA Worldwide (AAA) promotion. On September 3, 2007, Marvin was part of the main event of a joint AAA/Noah show called TripleSEM. He teamed with Mushiking Terry and Naomichi Marufuji to wrestle against Los Hell Brothers (Cibernético, Charly Manson, and Chessman) in a match that ended in a no-contest due to outside interference. In 2009, Marvin began teaming regularly with Taiji Ishimori, setting his sights on the junior tag team title for a second time. In early 2010, the GHC Junior Heavyweight Tag Team Championship was vacated when Kotaro Suzuki suffered a knee injury. Ishimori and Marvin teamed up for a tournament to determine the next champions. They defeated Bobby Fish and Eddie Edwards in the first round and Genba Hirayanagi and Yoshinbou Kanemaru in the finals to win the GHC Junior Heavyweight Tag Team Championship. On August 22, Marvin and Ishimori lost the GHC Junior Heavyweight Tag Team Championship to New Japan Pro-Wrestling representatives Koji Kanemoto and Tiger Mask. In July 2011, Marvin reunited with his brother Rocky Marvin to take part in the 2011 Nippon TV Cup Jr. Heavyweight Tag League. After one victory and three losses, the team finished last in their block of the tournament. On October 16, 2011, Marvin defeated Satoshi Kajiwara to win the vacant GHC Junior Heavyweight Championship for the first time. Immediately after the match, Marvin vacated the title, declaring that he wanted to earn it by defeating Katsuhiko Nakajima, who had been forced to vacate the title due to injury and whom Marvin considered the real champion. Nakajima returned on November 27 and defeated Marvin for the vacant GHC Junior Heavyweight Championship. On July 22, 2012, Marvin and Super Crazy, known as Los Mexitosos, defeated Atsushi Aoki and Kotaro Suzuki to win the GHC Junior Heavyweight Tag Team Championship. They lost the title to Genba Hirayanagi and Maybach Taniguchi, Jr. on March 10, 2013. In July 2013, Los Mexitosos entered in the NTV G+ Cup Junior Heavyweight Tag League for the vacant GHC Junior Heavyweight Tag Team Championship. The team won three of their four matches but did not advance to the finals.

Marvin, working as the masked Bengala persona, returned to Noah on July 18, 2015, entering the 2015 Global Junior Heavyweight League. He finished the tournament with a record of three wins and three losses, failing to advance to the finals.

Lucha Libre AAA Worldwide (2007–2008, 2013–2017)
Two weeks after TripleSEM, Marvin traveled to Mexico to team with Latin Lover and La Parka, defeating the La Legión Extranjera team of Abismo Negro, Ron Killings, Kenzo Suzuki and X-Pac in one of the featured matches on the 2007 Verano de Escandalo event. Marvin made a further appearance in AAA on June 13, 2008, wrestling at Triplemanía XVI as part of the Mexican Powers, alongside Crazy Boy and Último Gladiador, as they defeated La Legión Extranjera (Bryan Danielson, Jack Evans, and Teddy Hart) and La Familia de Tijuana (Extreme Tiger, Halloween, and T.J. Xtreme) in a three-way tag team elimination match, On April 15, 2013, Marvin returned to AAA, joining Los Perros del Mal.

On May 2, 2014, Marvin returned to AAA, working under a mask as the tecnico character "Bengala", with no public acknowledgement that it was Ricky Marvin under the mask. He won his first match as Bengala when he pinned Los Perros del Mal leader El Hijo del Perro Aguayo in a six-man tag team main event. On June 7 at Verano de Escándalo, Bengala won an eight-way match to advance to the finals of a tournament to determine the number one contender to the AAA Cruiserweight Championship. Bengala received his title shot with eight other challengers on August 17 at Triplemanía XXII but failed to capture the title. During this period, he also appeared on the first and second seasons of Lucha Underground but did not have a featured role on the show. In 2016, the Bengala gimmick was taken over by Super Nova, while Fuentes began working as Ricky Marvin once more.

Marvin was teamed up with Averno and Chessman, forming a new trio called Los OGT. Los OGT won the AAA World Trios Championship on November 4, 2016, as they defeated Los Xinetes ("The Horsemen"; El Zorro, Dark Cuervo and Dark Scoria). They lost the title to El Apache, Faby Apache and Mary Apache on March 5, 2017, when Marvin was defeated by Faby in a singles match. On October 30, 2017, Marvin left AAA.

Personal life
Ricardo Fuentes is a second-generation wrestler; his father, Ricardo Fuentes, worked under the ring name "Aries" for many years and had a hand in training Fuentes. His brother, Rolando Fuentes Romero, is also a wrestler; he originally worked as the Mini-Estrella Rocky Marvin, playing off family connection between them, but currently wrestles as Mini Histeria for AAA.

Championships and accomplishments
Lucha Libre AAA Worldwide
AAA World Trios Championship (1 time) – with Averno and Chessman
Consejo Mundial de Lucha Libre
CMLL Japan Super Lightweight Championship (2 times)
Mexican National Lightweight Championship (1 time)
Estudio Wrestling Association
EWA World Championship (1 time)
Imperio Lucha Libre
Campeonato Sudamericano de Imperio (1 time, current)
Powerslam Wrestling
PW Heavyweight Championship (1 time)
Pro Wrestling Illustrated
PWI ranked him #107 of the 500 best singles wrestlers of the PWI 500 in 2007
Pro Wrestling Noah
GHC Junior Heavyweight Championship (1 time)
GHC Junior Heavyweight Tag Team Championship (3 times) – with Kotaro Suzuki (1), Taiji Ishimori (1), and Super Crazy (1)
Toryumon
NWA World Welterweight Championship (1 time)
Universal Wrestling Entertainment
UWE Tag Team Championship (1 time) – with Super Crazy
Xplosion Nacional de Lucha
XNL Championship (1 time)
 Xtreme Mexican Wrestling
 XMW Junior Heavyweight Championship (1 time)

Luchas de Apuestas record

Footnotes

References

External links
Cagematch profile

1980 births
Living people
Masked wrestlers
Mexican male professional wrestlers
People from Veracruz (city)
Professional wrestlers from Veracruz
GHC Junior Heavyweight Champions
GHC Junior Heavyweight Tag Team Champions
AAA World Trios Champions
CMLL World Lightweight Champions
NWA World Welterweight Champions